The World Group was the highest level of Davis Cup competition in 1998. The first-round losers went into the Davis Cup World Group Qualifying Round, and the winners progressed to the quarterfinals and were guaranteed a World Group spot for 1999.

Sweden were the defending champions and won their second consecutive title, defeating Italy in the final, 4–1. The final was held at the Forum di Assago in Milan, Italy, from 4 to 6 December. It was the Swedish team's 7th Davis Cup title overall.

Participating teams

Draw

First round

Slovakia vs. Sweden

Germany vs. South Africa

Brazil vs. Spain

Switzerland vs. Czech Republic

Italy vs. India

Australia vs. Zimbabwe

Belgium vs. Netherlands

United States vs. Russia

Quarterfinals

Germany vs. Sweden

Spain vs. Switzerland

Italy vs. Zimbabwe

United States vs. Belgium

Semifinals

Sweden vs. Spain

United States vs. Italy

Final

Italy vs. Sweden

References

External links
Davis Cup official website

World Group
Davis Cup World Group
Davis Cup